The 2003 Bank Alfalah Cup was a triangular ODI cricket competition held in Rangiri Dambulla International Stadium, Dambulla from 10 to 23 May 2003. It featured the national cricket teams of New Zealand, Pakistan and Sri Lanka. The tournament was won by New Zealand, who defeated Pakistan in the final.

Points table

1st ODI

2nd ODI

3rd ODI

4th ODI

5th ODI

6th ODI

Final

References

2003 in Pakistani cricket
Cricket in the United Arab Emirates
2003 in Sri Lankan cricket
2003 in New Zealand cricket
One Day International cricket competitions
Cricket in Dambulla